Gatel is a French surname.

List of people with the surname 

 (born 1953), French politician, member of the Senate
 Maud Gatel (born 1979), French politician
 Marie-Pierre Gatel (born 1968), French alpine skier

See also 

 Patel

Surnames
French-language surnames
Surnames of French origin